Jørgen Salsten (born 4 May 1963) is a Norwegian former ice hockey player. He was born in Oslo, Norway, the brother of Petter Salsten, and played for the club Furuset IF. He played for the Norwegian national ice hockey team at the 1988 Winter Olympics.

References

External links

1963 births
Living people
Ice hockey players at the 1988 Winter Olympics
Norwegian ice hockey players
Olympic ice hockey players of Norway
Ice hockey people from Oslo